William Christopher Friley, known as W. C. Friley (July 12, 1845 – April 11, 1911), was a Southern Baptist clergyman and college president. He was from 1892 to 1894 the first president of Hardin-Simmons University in Abilene, Texas, and the second president from 1909 to 1910 of Louisiana College in Pineville, Louisiana. The two assignments were fifteen years apart.

Background
A native of Mississippi, municipality and county unknown. Friley was the son of John J. and Mary F. Friley (both born c. 1823). Friley fought as a teenager for the Confederate Army in the American Civil War. He graduated in 1871 from Baptist-affiliated Mississippi College in Clinton, as did two later Louisiana College presidents, Edgar Godbold and Rory Lee.

Friley's first pastorate after receiving his degree was in Yazoo City, Mississippi, and Friley received high marks from the state mission board for his work there.

Baptist career
A clear outline of Friley's life is missing; He seems to have appeared at unlikely places in time across Mississippi, Louisiana, and Texas. He was a Baptist pastor in Monroe, Louisiana, and thereafter he was listed as the correspondence secretary at the Louisiana Baptist Convention. In November 1880, through a series of revivals, helped to establish the First Baptist Church in Opelousas in St. Landry Parish in South Louisiana.

Friley was the founding president of the former Ruston College in Ruston, Louisiana, a forerunner institution to Louisiana Tech University, which lasted for seven years and had annual enrollments of about 250 students. Louisiana Tech was launched in 1894 as "Louisiana Polytechnic Institute", by which time Friley had arrived at and already left Hardin-Simmons. Because it is the first college built in Texas west of Fort Worth, Hardin-Simmons, then known as Simmons College, is often called a "true pioneer institution". While at Hardin-Simmons, he was half-owner of the denominational newspaper, West Texas Baptists, but he sold his interest even before he left Abilene.

In 1899, he was a pastor in Mexia in Limestone County and was in the process of relocating to Rockwall in the Dallas-Fort Worth Metroplex.

Family and death
Friley and his wife, the former Ellen Douglas (1855-1939), also a Mississippi native, had two children. Daughter Mittie K Friley Howell (1878-1962) was born in DeSoto Parish south of Shreveport in northwestern Louisiana. Their son, Charles Edwin Friley (1887-1958), also born in Louisiana, had a highly successful career in higher education. He attended Sam Houston Teachers College in Huntsville, Texas, Baylor University in Waco, Texas, and graduated from Texas A&M University in College Station. Charles Friley received a Master of Science degree from Columbia University in New York City. At Texas A&M, Friley was registrar from 1912 to 1924 and dean of arts and sciences from 1924 to 1932. In 1932, he became the dean of the science division at Iowa State University in Ames, Iowa. He was named vice president of the institution in 1935 and elevated to president in 1936, a position which he held until 1953. He and his second wife, the former Vera Foreman (1896-1947), are interred at the Iowa State University Cemetery. Charles Friley's first wife died in their fifth year of marriage and left behind two sons; there was a daughter from the marriage to Vera. He then married for a third time.
 
Friley died the year after leaving Louisiana College. He, his wife, and their daughter and son-in-law, John Webb Howell, Sr. (1875-1951), are interred at Bryan City Cemetery in Bryan in Brazos County, Texas.

References

 

1845 births
1911 deaths
People from Yazoo City, Mississippi
People from Abilene, Texas
People from Monroe, Louisiana
People from Ruston, Louisiana
People from Pineville, Louisiana
People from Limestone County, Texas
Mississippi College alumni
Presidents of Louisiana Christian University
People of Mississippi in the American Civil War
Confederate States Army soldiers
19th-century Baptist ministers from the United States
20th-century Baptist ministers from the United States
Baptists from Mississippi
Baptists from Louisiana